Vanambadi is a 1963 Indian Tamil-language thriller film, directed by G. R. Nathan, produced by K. Murukesan and Kannadasan, and written by Valampuri Somanathan. A remake of the Bengali film Sesh Porichoy, it stars S. S. Rajendran and Devika, with R. Muthuraman, S. V. Sahasranamam, T. R. Rajakumari, T. R. Ramachandran, R. S. Manohar, Pushpalatha, Sheela and Kamal Haasan. The film was released on 9 March 1963 and emerged a success.

Plot 

Meena, a young woman, escapes from the clutches of a womanizing Zamindar. She attempts suicide and is saved by an elderly couple, who adopt her. They wish her to wed their nephew Sekhar, and the wedding is arranged. But during the ceremony, another man shows up claiming Meena to be his wife. She is arrested for the attempted murder of the Zamindar. But she says she does not know him. Her adoptive brother Mohan and a friend Nithyanandham try to solve the mystery. Meena runs away from the family to relieve them of the anguish she has caused them and they later find her as a stage/playback singer calling herself as Kausalya Devi. But Kausalya Devi claims she has never seen them before. How they resolve the mystery forms rest of the story.

Cast 
 S. S. Rajendran as Sekhar
 Devika as Uma/Meena/Sumathi/Kausalya Devi
 R. Muthuraman as Mohan
 S. V. Sahasranamam as Thanikachalam
 T. R. Ramachandran as Nithyanandham
 R. S. Manohar as Gopal
 Javar Seetharaman as Dr. Shivasankaran
 Kamal Haasan as Ravi
 T. R. Rajakumari as Parvathi
Pushpalatha as Kalyani
 Sheela as Chithra
 V. S. Raghavan as Somasundaram
O. A. K. Thevar as Zamindar Marthandam
 M. E. Madhavan as Sundaramoorthy
 Janaki
 Radhabhai
 Jyothi Lakshmi as a dancer

Production 
Vanambadi is a remake of the Bengali film Sesh Porichoy. It was produced by K. Murukesan and Kannadasan, directed and photographed by G. R. Nathan, written by Valampuri Somanathan, and edited by S. Surya. It was the last film for T. R. Rajakumari as an actress.

Soundtrack 
The soundtrack was composed by K. V. Mahadevan and lyrics for all songs were written by Kannadasan. The song "Gangaikarai" is set in Abheri raga, and "Thookanna Kuruvi" is set in "Suddha Dhanyasi with Charukesi". For the song "Kadavul Manithanai", Kannadasan initially wrote the lyrics "Avan Kadhalithe Vedhanaiyil Saaga Vendum" to which singer T. M. Soundararajan objected as he was religious and would not sing lines which degrade god and suggested to change the lyrics. Kannadasan finally changed the lyrics to "Vaada Vendum".

Release and reception 
Vanambadi was released on 9 March 1963. Kanthan of Kalki positively reviewed the film, saying the titular skylark was singing well. The film was commercially successful, and Devika was particularly appreciated for playing the double role.

References

Bibliography

External links 
 

1960s Tamil-language films
1960s thriller films
1963 films
Films about twin sisters
Films scored by K. V. Mahadevan
Indian black-and-white films
Indian thriller films
Tamil remakes of Bengali films
Twins in Indian films